Melanoplus bowditchi, the sagebrush grasshopper, is a species of spur-throated grasshopper in the family Acrididae. It is found in North America.

Subspecies
These two subspecies belong to the species Melanoplus bowditchi:
 Melanoplus bowditchi bowditchi Scudder, 1878 i c g
 Melanoplus bowditchi canus Hebard, 1925 i c g
Data sources: i = ITIS, c = Catalogue of Life, g = GBIF, b = Bugguide.net

References

Melanoplinae
Articles created by Qbugbot
Insects described in 1878